Kamaneh may refer to:
 Kamaneh, Lorestan
 Kamaneh-ye Mirzabeygi, Lorestan Province
 Kamaneh, West Azerbaijan